Huck's Raft is a history of American childhood and youth, written by Steven Mintz. The 2006 H-Net review wrote that the book was the best single-volume history of its kind.

References

External links 

 
 

2004 non-fiction books
Harvard University Press books
History books about education
History of childhood
English-language books
Merle Curti Award winners